Jenesano is a town and municipality in the  Márquez Province, part of the Colombian Department of Boyacá. Jenesano borders Nuevo Colón in the west, Ramiriquí in the east, Boyacá, Boyacá in the north and Tibaná in the south.

Etymology 
Jenesano was called Piranguata at time of foundation. The name was changed in 1833 to Genazzano, referring to the province in Italy. Later, it became Jenesano, meaning "healthy people" or "healthy village".

History 
The area of Jenesano before the Spanish conquest was inhabited by the Muisca, organised in their loose Muisca Confederation. Jenesano was part of the rule of the zaque of Hunza.

Modern Jenesano was not founded until 1828, after the independence of Colombia from the Spanish Empire.

Economy 
Main activity of Jenesano is agriculture, predominantly fruits as uchuva, tree tomatoes, cucumbers, peas, beans, maize, peaches, pears and apples.

Gallery

References 

Municipalities of Boyacá Department
Populated places established in 1828
1828 establishments in Gran Colombia
Muisca Confederation